Cuban Love is a 2019 Dutch romantic comedy film directed by Johan Nijenhuis.

The film won the Golden Film award after having sold 100,000 tickets and the film also won the Platinum Film award after having sold 400,000 tickets. It was the sixth film directed by Nijenhuis that won this award. The film became the second best visited Dutch film of 2019.

Plot 

Loes (Susan Visser) discovers that her daughter (Abbey Hoes) is getting married in Cuba. Loes books the first flight to Cuba to prevent this.

Cast 

 Susan Visser as Loes
 Abbey Hoes as Maartje
 Rolf Sanchez as Carlos
 Jan Kooijman as Jan
 Maaike Martens as Machteld
 Tjebbo Gerritsma as Alex
 Niek Roozen as Hein
 Maarten Dannenberg as Diego
 Mareya Salazar as Benita

Production 

Two scenes were not permitted to be filmed in Cuba and these were filmed in Ibiza instead.

Reception 

The film received poor reviews by critics. The film was said to contain many clichés and a stereotypical portrayal of Cuba and Cubans.

References

External links 
 

2019 films
2019 romantic comedy films
2010s Dutch-language films
Films set in Cuba
Films shot in Cuba
Films shot in the Balearic Islands
Dutch romantic comedy films
Films directed by Johan Nijenhuis